Conde is a small town in Lobata District on São Tomé Island in São Tomé and Príncipe. Its population is 758 (2012 census). The town is located 3 km east of Guadalupe, 3 km northwest of Santo Amaro and 4 km southwest of Micoló.

Population history

References

Populated places in Lobata District